Richmar Siberie (born 24 March 1982), also known as Rocky, is a Curaçaoan professional footballer who plays as a forward for Italian club Camporosso.

Club career
Born in Willemstad, Curaçao, in the former Netherlands Antilles, Siberie began his career with Dutch side Cambuur Leeuwarden.

He played for Maribor in the Slovenian PrvaLiga during the 2005–06 season. He started the 2006–07 season with Wuppertaler SV in Germany in the Regionalliga Nord. During the January 2007 transfer window, Siberie moved to Malta and joined Valletta, scoring four goals in his first match against Marsa (6–1) on 3 February 2007. He is the first player from the Netherlands Antilles to have played in Malta. Siberie signed a contract with FC Dordrecht (Dutch second division) for the 2008–09 season.

International career
Siberie made his debut for the Netherlands Antilles national team in a January 2004 in a friendly match against Suriname. He then played in all four World Cup qualifying matches they played later that year.

In 2011 Siberie begin playing with Curaçao national football team which replaced Netherlands Antilles on international level.

He represented Seborga in their first international match against Sealand, scoring one goal in a 3–2 defeat.

References

1982 births
Living people
People from Willemstad
Dutch Antillean footballers
Association football forwards
Curaçao footballers
Curaçao international footballers
Netherlands Antilles international footballers
Dual internationalists (football)
CRKSV Jong Colombia players
SC Heerenveen players
SC Cambuur players
FC St. Pauli players
NK Maribor players
Wuppertaler SV players
Valletta F.C. players
SV 19 Straelen players
FC Dordrecht players
Eerste Divisie players
Regionalliga players
Slovenian PrvaLiga players
Maltese Premier League players
Curaçao expatriate footballers
Dutch Antillean expatriate footballers
Expatriate footballers in Germany
Expatriate footballers in Slovenia
Expatriate footballers in Malta
Expatriate footballers in Italy